Nikolaos Loukanis was a 16th-century Greek Renaissance humanist. He worked in Venice where in 1526 he produced a translation of Homer's Iliad into modern Greek which is credited as one of the first literary texts published in Modern Greek (as most contemporary Greek scholars wrote in the Koine).

Known works
Homer's Iliad, translation into modern Greek

See also
Greek scholars in the Renaissance

References

Greek Renaissance humanists
16th-century Greek people
16th-century writers
Modern Greek language
16th-century Greek writers
16th-century male writers